Cameron Reynolds (born February 7, 1995) is an American professional basketball player for Budućnost VOLI of the Montenegrin First League, the ABA League and the EuroCup. He played college basketball for the Tulane Green Wave.

College career
Reynolds was named American Athletic Conference Most Improved Player as a junior. He averaged 17 points and 6.8 rebounds per game. As a senior at Tulane, Reynolds averaged 15.1 points and 6.3 rebounds per game.

Professional career

Stockton Kings (2018–2019)
After going undrafted in the 2018 NBA draft, Reynolds signed with the Stockton Kings of the NBA G League. He averaged 16.0 points per game in 33 appearances.

Minnesota Timberwolves (2019)
Reynolds was signed to a 10-day contract by the Minnesota Timberwolves on February 27, 2019. He made his NBA debut on March 3, 2019, scoring two points in two minutes of play in a 121–135 loss to the Washington Wizards.
On March 15, 2019, Reynolds signed a multi year deal with the Timberwolves, but was later waived by the Timberwolves on June 28, 2019.

Milwaukee Bucks/Wisconsin Herd (2019–2020)
Reynolds signed a two-way contract with the Milwaukee Bucks on July 26, 2019. In the deal he will split time between the Bucks and their NBA G League affiliate, the Wisconsin Herd. Reynolds did not ending up appearing in any games for the Bucks.

Austin Spurs (2020–2021)
On December 2, 2020, Reynolds was included in the training camp roster of the San Antonio Spurs, but was later waived by the Spurs on December 19 after appeared in one pre-season game. He ultimately landed on the roster of the Spurs' G League affiliate, the Austin Spurs, appearing in 14 games and averaging 16.1 points, 4.6 rebounds and 1.5 assists in 29.0 minutes.

San Antonio Spurs (2021)
On March 26, 2021, the San Antonio Spurs signed Reynolds to a 10-day contract.

Houston Rockets (2021)
On May 14, 2021, the Houston Rockets signed Reynolds to a 10-day contract.

Dolomiti Energia Trento (2021–2022)
On July 3, 2021, he has signed with Dolomiti Energia Trento of the Italian Lega Basket Serie A (LBA).
On February 21, 2022, Reynolds' NBA G League rights were traded from the Austin Spurs to the Agua Caliente Clippers in exchange for Ky Bowman.

KK Budućnost (2022–present)
On July 14, 2022, he has signed with Budućnost VOLI of the Montenegrin First League.

Career statistics

NBA

Regular season

|-
| align="left" | 
| align="left" | Minnesota
| 19 || 0 || 13.6 || .423 || .412 || .889 || 1.6 || .7 || .3 || .1 || 5.0
|-
| align="left" | 
| align="left" | San Antonio
| 3 || 0 || 2.0 || .500 || – || – || .0 || .0 || .0 || .0 || 0.7
|-
| align="left" | 
| align="left" | Houston
| 2 || 0 || 17.0 || .313 || .250 || – || 2.5 || 1.0 || .0 || .0 || 6.5
|- class="sortbottom"
| style="text-align:center;" colspan="2"| Career
| 24 || 0 || 12.5 || .406 || .381 || .889 || 1.5 || .6 || .3 || .1 || 4.6

References

External links
Tulane Green Wave bio

1995 births
Living people
American men's basketball players
Aquila Basket Trento players
Austin Spurs players
Basketball players from Texas
Houston Rockets players
Minnesota Timberwolves players
Pearland High School alumni
People from Pearland, Texas
San Antonio Spurs players
Shooting guards
Small forwards
Sportspeople from Harris County, Texas
Stockton Kings players
Tulane Green Wave men's basketball players
Undrafted National Basketball Association players
United States men's national basketball team players
Wisconsin Herd players